Ezhou railway station (Chinese: 鄂州站) is a railway station in Echeng District, Ezhou, Hubei, China.

History
The lower, north-south platforms serve the Wuhan–Jiujiang railway. Reconstruction of the station began in 2010. The faster Wuhan–Jiujiang passenger railway opened on 18 June 2014 and passes east-west, creating a cross shape. Ezhou railway station sees passenger services on both lines.

References

Railway stations in China opened in 1998
Railway stations in Hubei